Misi Taulapapa (born 25 January 1982) is a Samoa international rugby league footballer who plays as a  or er for Doncaster in Betfred League 1.

He has previously played for the New Zealand Warriors and the Cronulla Sharks in the NRL, and the Sheffield Eagles and Featherstone Rovers in the Championship. Taulapapa has also played for the Newcastle Thunder in League 1.

Early years
Taulapapa was born Auckland, New Zealand.

He originally played rugby union for the Waitemata Football club, in the Auckland Rugby Union competition. He played with Waitemata when they won the Gallagher Shield in 2003. Taulapapa also represented the Kelston Boys High School's First XV in both regional and national tournaments.

Playing career
Taulapapa switched to rugby league in 2004. Taulapapa was selected to play in the Bartercard Cup competition for the Marist Richmond Brothers from where he was picked up by the New Zealand Warriors.

Taulapapa played in six matches for the New Zealand Warriors in 2006 before he was released mid-season for turning up to a training session intoxicated.

After being released by the Warriors halfway through the 2006 season he moved to Queensland to finish the season at the Central Comets.

Cronulla-Sutherland Sharks
Taulapapa signed with the Cronulla-Sutherland Sharks in 2007. Here he played as a solid winger and was a fringe NRL player. Taulapapa made 19 appearances for the club in 2008 as Cronulla finished 3rd on the table.

Taulapapa scored a hat-trick in the 2008 qualifying finals game against the Canberra Raiders. 2 weeks later, Taulapapa played on the wing for Cronulla in their 28-0 preliminary final defeat by Melbourne.

Gateshead Thunder
Taulapapa originally signed with the Gateshead Thunder for the 2010 season. However the club had financial difficulties which voided Taulapapa's contract.

Sheffield Eagles
He eventually signed with the Sheffield Eagles. After starting on the wing, he moved to full back after a long term injury ruled out the player in that position. He also took on the captaincy and by the end of the season was one of the stand out players for the Eagles, scoring a hat trick in a victory over the Leigh Centurions. two weeks later, against the same opponents in the play-offs, he suffered a broken leg that ruled him out for the remainder of the 2010 season.

Hull Kingston Rovers
In August 2011 Taulapapa signed to Super League club Hull Kingston Rovers. However, after his signature had been announced, Hull KR appointed a new manager - Craig Sandercock - who subsequently decided that Taulapapa did not fit into his plans for the 2012 season.

Sheffield Eagles (rejoin)
Taulapapa was released from his contract with Hull KR, without having played a single game, and re-signed for Sheffield, and later signed for Featherstone Rovers (captain) (Heritage № 1040). He would move to play for the Newcastle Thunder for the 2019 season.

Doncaster RLFC
On 9 Nov 2020 it was announced that he had signed for Doncaster for 2021.

Representative career
Taulapapa was a part of the Samoa squad for the 2008 Rugby League World Cup.

In 2009 he was named as part of the Samoa squad for the Pacific Cup.

References

External links

Featherstone Rovers profile
Misi Taulapapa at Sharks.com

1982 births
Living people
Auckland rugby league team players
Cronulla-Sutherland Sharks players
Doncaster R.L.F.C. players
Featherstone Rovers players
Marist Richmond Brothers players
New Zealand sportspeople of Samoan descent
New Zealand rugby league players
New Zealand Warriors players
Point Chevalier Pirates players
Richmond Bulldogs players
Rugby league fullbacks
Rugby league wingers
Rugby league players from Auckland
Samoa national rugby league team players
Samoan rugby league players
Sheffield Eagles players